Dead Space: Downfall is a 2008 American adult animated psychological science fiction horror film directed by Chuck Patton, written by Justin Gray and Jimmy Palmiotti and developed by Film Roman under the supervision of Electronic Arts; Electronic Arts also published the 2008 survival horror video game Dead Space upon which the film is based. It first released direct-to-video in October, before seeing a television showing the following month on Starz Encore.

Downfall is a prequel to Dead Space, taking place after the limited comic series. Set aboard the planet mining ship USG Ishimura, it details the events following the transportation of an artifact called the Marker from the planet Aegis VII, leading to the deaths of nearly everyone on board at the hands of reanimated mutated corpses dubbed "Necromorphs".

The film was produced as part of Electronic Art's multimedia expansion of the plot, referred to by staff as "IP cubed". Patton was given relative freedom with the narrative and visuals, wanting to create the goriest feature Film Roman had produced. Electronic Arts provided art assets to Film Roman, allowing an accurate representation of the game's universe. The DVD release earned over $1 million in sales. Reviews were mixed, with praise for its voice acting, writing and animation, but criticism for its short length and emphasis on graphic violence over horror and suspense. Electronic Arts and Film Roman would collaborate again on 2011's Dead Space: Aftermath, a prequel to Dead Space 2.

Plot 
Dead Space: Downfall takes place in the year 2508, centuries after humanity narrowly avoided extinction due to resource depletion by "cracking" planets to extract their resources in a three-year process. The story begins during the second year of an illegal mining operation on the planet Aegis VII funded by the Church of Unitology. Colony geologist Jennifer Barrows discovers a monolith-like artifact identified as a Marker, an object sacred to the Unitologists' beliefs. In reality, the Marker is a human copy of an alien object that begins to have a fatal influence over the colony, eventually causing an outbreak of reanimated mutated corpses referred to outside the movie as "Necromorphs". Downfall details how the Marker's infection reached and overcame the Ishimura, told through the eyes of a number of Aegis VII miners and Ishimura crew members.

The film opens with a video message from security chief Alissa Vincent, saying the Ishimura is lost and both the ship and the Marker that caused its fall must be destroyed. The story goes back to Barrows' discovery of the Marker in an area showing signs of ancient human mining. By the time the Ishimura arrives, the Aegis VII colony has undergone a catastrophic breakdown, with dozens killed and many reports of violent behavior and psychosis. The Marker is brought on board on the authority of Captain Mathius and Dr Kyne, prompting many Unitologist crew to worship it, among them engineer Samuel Irons. Vincent grows increasingly angry about having the Marker on board, believing it was responsible for the colony's collapse.

After the planetcrack, all contact is lost with the colony, which is completely overrun by Necromorphs. Jennifer, having lost her sanity, kills herself, and when her husband Colin escapes with her body to the Ishimura, she is infected by a stowaway Necromorph Infector and then kills Colin before crash landing and escaping onto the ship. Kyne, already questioning their real mission to bring the Marker back to the Church, briefly sees the converted Barrows. Vincent's six-person team—herself, Ramirez, Hanson, Shen, Pendleton and Dobbs, investigate a disturbance, finding growing numbers of Necromorphs killing the crew one by one and overtaking the ship. During their encounters, Dobbs and Pendleton are killed, and Hanson is only saved by Irons' intervention. Meanwhile Mathius grows increasingly paranoid and delusional and lashes out at Kyne after he protests bring the Marker back to Earth, forcing the bridge crew to restrain him. Kyne attempts to sedate him but Mathius attacks Kyne, causing him to accidentally stab Mathius in the eye, killing him. Kyne then flees as all escape pods and shuttles are launched empty, trapping everyone on board.

En route to the bridge, Hanson goes insane, kills Shen and attacks Vincent before Ramirez fatally shoots him. In an effort to save survivors, Irons sacrifices himself to hold off the Necromorphs. Vincent and Ramirez then go to stop Kyne deactivating the Ishimuras engines and crashing them into Aegis VII. Ramirez dies during the trek, and Kyne reveals the Marker's influence to Vincent before escaping again. With the Ishimura stable but in a decaying orbit, Vincent reaches the Marker, which the Necromorphs cannot approach as it kept them sealed on Aegis VII. Exhausted and beginning to suffer from hallucinations, Vincent makes her video message, then attempts to escape on a remaining shuttle. Trapped by Necromorphs, she opens the bay doors, sending herself and nearby Necromorphs into space after launching a distress beacon. The film ends with the UGS Kellion responding to the distress call.

Voice actors

Production 
The survival horror video game Dead Space began production in 2006 at EA Redwood Shores, based on creator Glen Schofield's wish to create the most frightening horror game possible. Alongside the game, the universe of Dead Space was expanded into a multimedia narrative described by its publisher Electronic Arts as "IP cubed"; it extended across the game, the limited comic series Dead Space, and the animated film Downfall. The concept for a film was around from the beginning of the game's production. While each part of the media expansion was handled by different people, the game's development team acted as overall controller, ensuring continuity between each property.

The film was produced by Film Roman, the animation unit of Starz Media known for their work on The Simpsons and King of the Hill. Downfall was directed by Chuck Patton, known for his work on Todd McFarlane's Spawn. From the outset, Patton wanted Downfall to be the goriest animated feature the studio had done up to this point. Producer Joe Goyette described this element as "creating another 400 ways to kill people". The team opted for traditional 2D animation both for time and budgetary reasons, and to craft more sympathetic characters. Due to the simultaneous production of the game and movie, there was a lot of collaboration between the two teams. The "Downfall" subtitle was a reference to the film's content. While the different media projects shared a dark and grim aesthetic, Electronic Arts did not try to keep the art design consistent between them.

While the mythology and broad strokes of plot were in place, the plot details of Downfall were left up to Film Roman as long as they did not deviate from the established lore and timeline. So the film would be accurate to the game, the production team were given 3D assets from the game by Electronic Arts, along with reference material for the atmosphere and Necromorph transformations. The team got further reference material for themselves to portray the injuries and transformations. The film was co-written by Justin Gray and Jimmy Palmiotti in collaboration with the animation team. For Gray and Palmiotti, the film gave them a chance to let loose with the level of violence and vent their frustration at being told to hold back in their earlier work. While the events of the comic and the game were set, and one character had to survive the film, the writers were otherwise allowed to "write madness". According to the writers and director, the amount of content cut during production would have made a sequel. A notable cut section, which was seen as overly ambitious and requiring too much time, was a fight between Vincent and a unique Necromorph born from the fused bodies of her squad mates.

Downfall was first announced in March 2008. It premiered in the United Kingdom at the 2008 Sci-Fi-London film festival. The movie was released direct-to-video on DVD and Blu-ray on October 28, roughly a week after the release of Dead Space. The extras included an isolated soundtrack, a deleted scene, and cheat codes for the game. The Blu-ray edition also included a standard DVD edition and digital editions compatible with PlayStation Portable and Microsoft Windows. It was co-published by Anchor Bay Entertainment and Manga Entertainment. It later premiered on television through Starz Encore on November 2. Electronic Arts and Starz Media would collaborate again on Dead Space: Aftermath, released in 2011 as a prequel to Dead Space 2.

Critical reception 
Upon its debut in the United States, the DVD release reached twenty-third place in sales charts, reaching over 26,500 units and earning over $397,000. Ultimately, Downfall earned over $1,655,000 in DVD sales.

Christopher Monfette of IGN enjoyed the animation and staging of its scares and violence despite a limited color palette, but found the narrative was poorly paced with too many events happening in quick succession. He also faulted the dialogue and performances, and the Unitology subplot as unnecessary filler. Joystiqs Andrew Yoon felt that the movie was only for fans of the game, as its storyline was best understood by those who had already played Dead Space. Alongside this, Yoon faulted the characters, lack of reference to in-game events, and overfast pacing; ultimately, he felt it was better than bigger-budget Hollywood game adaptations. Jim Sterling, writing for Destructoid, said that the movie was enjoyable but relied too much on character cliches. He positively compared its tone and violence to a "a cartoony Event Horizon", and praised the animation quality despite it clashing with the parent game's realistic graphics.

Peter Debruge of Variety noted its technical achievements given its scale and market, but noted that its tone and apparent revelry in the deaths of its cast made it unenjoyable outside the original game's context. DVDTalks Adam Tyner felt that Downfall would have been better if it had focused on horror and suspence over violence and gore. He summarised that the film "captures the unflinchingly graphic violence of EA's survival horror video game, but it misses out on the suspense and intensity that leave it standing out as one of the year's best". Michael Thompson of Ars Technica again noted it as better than many larger-budget video game adaptations, citing Max Payne as an example of the latter. His biggest complaint was a lack of horror elements, with the focus on bloody violence undercuting any suspense. Play, as part of an article on Dead Space 3, called Downfall "Gory, quite silly, but good for fans and entertaining."

References

External links 
 
 
 Home market performance listed on The Numbers

2008 animated films
2008 direct-to-video films
2008 films
2008 horror films
2000s science fiction horror films
2000s monster movies
Adult animated science fiction films
American adult animated films
Animated films based on video games
Animated space adventure films
American animated horror films
American animated science fiction films
American psychological horror films
American space adventure films
American monster movies
American splatter films
American zombie films
Anime-influenced Western animation
Films set in the 26th century
Films set on spacecraft
Dead Space (franchise)
Works based on Electronic Arts video games
Film Roman films
2000s English-language films
2000s American films
American prequel films